Kế Sách is a township and capital of Kế Sách District, Sóc Trăng Province, Vietnam.

References

Populated places in Sóc Trăng province
District capitals in Vietnam
Townships in Vietnam